The  is a botanical garden in Hirara, Miyako-jima, Okinawa Prefecture, Japan.

Landscaping began in 1967 on a site that before the war was a forest of Ryūkyū pines. The garden now contains about 1,600 species of plant and 40,000 trees in an area of 120,000 m².

The gardens, located at 1166-286 Higashinakasonezoe, are open daily and admission is free.

See also 
 List of botanical gardens in Japan

References

External links
  Miyakojima City Botanical Garden
  Miyakojima City Botanical Garden

Botanical gardens in Japan
Gardens in Okinawa Prefecture